Dredd may refer to:

Judge Dredd/2000AD fictional universe

 Judge Dredd (character) (Joseph Dredd), fictional character from Judge Dredd/"2000AD" fictional universe
 2000 AD (comics), the Judge Dredd fictional universe
 Vienna Dredd (Vienna Pasternak), fictional character from Judge Dredd/"2000AD" fictional universe
 Rico Dredd, fictional character from Judge Dredd/"2000AD" fictional universe
 Dredd Vs Death (2003 novel) novel in the Judge Dredd/"2000AD" fictional universe

Movies
 Judge Dredd (1995 film), film based on the Judge Dredd fictional universe
 Dredd (2012 film), film based on the Judge Dredd fictional universe

Other uses
 Club DREDD, nightclub in Quezon City, Philippines.
 Miles Dredd (Dredd), fictional character from the Max Steele fictional universe

See also
 Receptor activated solely by a synthetic ligand, also known as DREADD
 Judge Dredd (disambiguation)
 Dread (disambiguation)
 Dred (disambiguation)

Disambiguation pages